The 2000 United States presidential election in Arkansas took place on November 7, 2000, and was part of the 2000 United States presidential election. State voters chose six representatives, or electors to the Electoral College, who voted for president and vice president.

In this election, Arkansas was seen as a swing state, Bush's opposition to abortion and support for the death penalty, issues that resonated with many Arkansans combined with Gore distancing himself from the popularity of Arkansas native and sitting president Bill Clinton created a battleground environment in the state.

In the end, the state was won by Governor George W. Bush by a 5.4% margin of victory; a hard swing right from the 17-point Democratic victory four years prior. He won a majority of the popular vote and the state's six electoral votes, marking the first time in history that a Democratic presidential nominee won the national popular vote without carrying Arkansas. Bush was the first Republican to carry the state since his father in 1988. , this is the last election in which Ashley County, Craighead County, Cross County, Dallas County, Drew County, Greene County, Hot Spring County, Izard County, Lafayette County, Nevada County, and Ouachita County have voted for the Democratic candidate, and the last time a Democrat has won any congressional district in the state in a presidential election. This is also the last time Arkansas voted to the left of Colorado and Virginia.

Arkansas was one of nine states won by Bush that had supported Clinton twice that voted against Gore (whom was serving as Clinton’s Vice President during the election)

Results

By county

Counties that flipped from Democratic to Republican
Arkansas (Largest city: Stuttgart)
Calhoun (Largest city: Hampton)
Cleburne (Largest city: Heber Springs)
Cleveland (Largest city: Rison)
Columbia (Largest city: Magnolia)
Conway (Largest city: Morrilton)
Faulkner (Largest city: Conway)
Franklin (Largest city: Ozark)
Fulton (Largest city: Salem)
Garland (Largest city: Hot Springs)
Grant (Largest city: Sheridan)
Howard (Largest city: Nashville)
Independence (Largest city: Batesville)
Johnson (Largest city: Clarksville)
Logan (Largest city: Booneville)
Lonoke (Largest city: Cabot)
Madison (Largest city: Huntsville)
Marion (Largest city: Bull Shoals)
Miller (Largest city: Texarkana)
Montgomery (Largest city: Mount Ida)
Perry (Largest city: Perryville)
Pike (Largest city: Glenwood)
Pope (Largest city: Russellville)
Prairie (Largest city: Des Arc)
Saline (Largest city: Benton)
Scott (Largest city: Waldron)
Sevier (Largest city: De Queen)
Sharp (Largest city: Cherokee Village)
Stone (Largest city: Mountain View)
Union (Largest city: El Dorado)
Van Buren (Largest city: Clinton)
Washington (Largest city: Fayetteville)
White (Largest city: Searcy)
Yell (Largest city: Dardanelle)

By congressional district
Bush won 2 of 4 congressional districts, including one held by a Democrat.

Electors

Technically the voters of Arkansas cast their ballots for electors: representatives to the Electoral College. Arkansas is allocated 6 electors because it has 4 congressional districts and 2 senators. All candidates who appear on the ballot or qualify to receive write-in votes must submit a list of 6 electors, who pledge to vote for their candidate and his or her running mate. Whoever wins the majority of votes in the state is awarded all 6 electoral votes. Their chosen electors then vote for president and vice president. Although electors are pledged to their candidate and running mate, they are not obligated to vote for them. An elector who votes for someone other than his or her candidate is known as a faithless elector.

The electors of each state and the District of Columbia met on December 18, 2000 to cast their votes for president and vice president. The Electoral College itself never meets as one body. Instead the electors from each state and the District of Columbia met in their respective capitols.

The following were the members of the Electoral College from the state. All were pledged to and voted for George W. Bush and Dick Cheney:
Pat Dodge
Bud Cummins
Mildred Homan
Betsy Thompson
Kim Hendren
Sarah Agee

See also
 United States presidential elections in Arkansas
 Presidency of George W. Bush

References

Arkansaa
2000
2000 Arkansas elections